Shep Comes Home is a 1948 American film written and directed by Ford Beebe for Lippert Pictures. It was a sequel to My Dog Shep (1946).

Cast
Flame as Shep
Robert Lowery as Mark Folger
Billy Kimbley as Larry Havens
Martin Garralaga as Manuel Ortiz
Margia Dean as Martha Langley
Sheldon Leonard as 'Swifty' Lewis
Michael Whalen as 'Chance' Martin

Production
Ford Beebe was attached in September 1948.

Filming started September 1948.

Robert L. Lippert, who financed, was hoping to turn the films into a series. However there were no more Shep films.

Margia Dean recalled "The dog always did it right on the first take—but the actors kept goofing up. (Laughs) That’s probably why they say actors don’t like working with animals. (Laughs)”

Margia Dean's performance led to her being cast in I Shot Jesse James.

References

External links

Shep Comes Home at TCMDB
Shep Comes Home at BFI

1948 films
American sequel films
American drama films
Films directed by Ford Beebe
Lippert Pictures films
1948 drama films
American black-and-white films
Films about dogs
Films about pets
1940s English-language films
1940s American films